Ahlen (Westphalian: Aulen) is a town in North Rhine-Westphalia, Germany, 30 km southeast of Münster. Ahlen is part of the District of Warendorf and is economically the most important town in that district. Ahlen is part of the larger Münster region, and of the historic Münsterland area.
The nearby villages of Dolberg, Vorhelm and Tönnishäuschen
are part of Ahlen, as well. The largest neighboring town is the city of Hamm to the southwest.

Geography

Neighbouring towns
Surrounding Ahlen are the towns of Sendenhorst, Ennigerloh, Beckum, Lippetal, Heessen (District of the city of Hamm) and Drensteinfurt.

Town districts
 Ahlen (downtown) with the farming communities of Borbein, Brockhausen, Ester, Halene, Oestrich and Rosendahl (area of the former town sections of Alt- and Neuahlen) all make up the core of the town.

Outlying villages
 Dolberg
 Vorhelm
 Tönnishäuschen

History

Early times

The first recorded mention of Ahlen is in the Vita Liudgeri, dating to about the year 850. The reason for the name, which means "eels", are unknown. An eel bedecked with a crown and feathers is on the town's coat of arms.

The start of settlement was likely due to there being a crossing over the river Werse, which was also the crossing of two key roads (Hamm–Ahlen–Warendorf and Beckum–Ahlen–Herbern), and the beginning of a third road (Ahlen–Münster).
In its early centuries, the fledgling settlement was built around an episcopal court. Within the safe haven of this church fortification, the first settlers were craftsmen and merchants who traded with the local farmers and peasants of the court.
Long-distance trading started in the second half of the 12th century — proof being the names of Ahlen merchants found on invoices from merchants in Lübeck. Ahlen was also part of the north German Hanse. During this time a town wall with five towers was built (about 1271). The stripping away of the town wall had begun in the year 1765 and the last hint of it was gone by 1929.

Ahlen grew quickly during the 13th century and in or about the year 1285, the population was so high that a new church (St. Marien) was founded next to the old one (St. Bartholomäus). This leads to the likelihood that Ahlen was one of the 18 biggest towns in Westphalia, at that time.
However, the town's growth was hindered in the 14th century by the Black Death. According to the town's census book of 1389, only 63 families were left in Ahlen. But the town rebounded. In 1454, a citizen list showed 212 families living in Ahlen; seven noble families and their attendants lived in the episcopal court as well. Based on this number of families, a calculated population estimate of 1,300 citizens would be realistic. By this time the town had four quarters — all of which being about the same size and each quarter being named after its own town gate.
Each quarter was responsible for defending its part of the town wall and gate.

During the 16th century, there were three plague epidemics in 1505, 1551 and 1592; leprosy also killed many people. In the year 1571, the mayor and the council decided to build a special hospital for leprosy. Disastrous fires in 1483, 1668 and 1744 were responsible for further halting Ahlen's growth.

About 20 documents of witch trials during the time from 1574 until 1652 survive. The hunt for witches started in 1574 with the death of four women. Thereafter, Peter Kleikamp was charged with being a werewolf; he was tortured and burned alive on the pyre. In 1616, Christian zum Loe was charged with wizardry; he went insane and died while in jail. The last known case was in 1652 against Anna Sadelers; she was tortured, burned alive on the pyre and beheaded.

National Socialism and World War II
In 1938 the people of Ahlen destroyed  the Ahlen synagogue. By November 1938, there were no more Jews in Ahlen.

Politics

Town Council

Coat of arms
Blazon: “In red, a gold crowned, inwardly curved, seven-fold winged silver eel. Above the coat of arms a three-tower wall crown with gate. ”The oldest seal shows the pious eel in the city gate, above it Saint Bartholomew. This saint is the patron saint of Ahlen. The seal has appeared since the 13th century: Certificate v. May 21, 1255 - "The city of Ahlen enters into a state of peace with the city of Cologne". Since the 17th century, only the eel has been represented, both in the city coat of arms and in the seal. In its current form, the coat of arms was awarded by the Prussian state on December 5, 1910.

Mayors

1809–1945
 1809–1813 Bernard Heinrich Hahues
 1813–1817 Bernard Anton von Hatzfeld
 1817–1822 Heinrich Anton Nacke
 1823–1856 Franz Wächter
 1857–1863 Theodor von Cloedt
 1863–1869 Wilhelm Diederich
 1869–1870 Ludwig Fry
 1870–1898 Johann Heinrich Hagemann
 1898–1923 Eduard Corneli
 1923–1934 Georg Rasche
 1934–1937 Franz Hackethal
 1938–1945 Otto Jansen

Honorary Mayors 1946–1996
 1946–1946 Friedrich Niemeyer
 1946–1948 Hermann Dreisilker (Waldmann)
 1948–1950 Hugo Stoffers
 1951–1957 Heinrich Lenfert
 1957–1969 Heinrich Linnemann
 1969–1984 Herbert Faust
 1984–1996 Horst Jaunich

Full-time Mayors since 1996
 1996–1999 Günter Harms
 1999–2015 Benedikt Ruhmöller
 since 2015 Andreas Berger

Town Directors/Main Civil Servants
 1945–1945 Wilhelm Buschhoff (set as mayor from English occupying troops in the function as town director)
 1945–1951 Wilhelm Kiwit
 1951–1963 Hugo Stoffers
 1963–1975 Johannes Baldauf
 1975–1985 Walter Priesnitz
 1985–1995 Gerd Willamowski
 2008 Benedikt Ruhmöller

Economy and Administration
One of the best known companies in Ahlen is Franz Kaldewei GmbH & Co. KG, one of the biggest bathtub manufacturers worldwide. Also well known is LR Health & Beauty Systems, which was bought by Apax Partners in 2004.

Transport
Ahlen station is on the Hamm–Minden railway and is served every hour by the Rhein-Weser-Express and the Ems-Börde-Bahn.

Education

Elementary schools
 Albert-Schweitzer-Schule
 Augustin-Wibbelt-Schule in the quarter Vorhelm
 Barbaraschule
 Diesterwegschule
 Don-Bosco-Schule
 Freiligrath Grundschule
 Lambertischule in the quarter Dolberg
 Ludgerischule
 Marienschule
 Martinschule
 Paul-Gerhardt-Schule

Secondary Modern Schools
 GHS Bodelschwinghschule
 Overbergschule
 Geschwister-Scholl-Schule

Junior High School (ages 10 to 16)
 Städtische Realschule Ahlen (closed)
 Städtische Sekundarschule (closed)
 Therese-Münsterteicher Gesamtschule (former Städtische Gesamtschule)

The Sekundarschule and TMG used the building of the former Realschule

High schools
 Gymnasium St. Michael
 Städtisches Gymnasium Ahlen

Comprehensive School
 Fritz-Winter-Gesamtschule

Special Needs School
 Johanna-Rose-Schule

Vocational Schools
 Berufskolleg Ahlen
 Berufskolleg St. Michael
 Fachschulen für Heilerziehungspflege der Caritas-Trägergesellschaft Nord
 Fachseminar für Altenpflege Gemeinnütziges Bildungszentrum GmbH
 Krankenpflegeschule im St.-Franziskus-Hospital Berufskolleg Ahlen

Places of interest

Buildings

 St. Bartholomäus Catholic Church
St. Marien Catholic Church
Residential Buildings
Burgmannshöfe
Ahlen Water Tower

Museums
Heimatmuseum
Kunstmuseum
Fritz Winter-Haus

Clubs
KunstVerein Ahlen
Initiative Bürgerzentrum Schuhfabrik e.V.
Ditib Ahlen Sporkulübü (ASK Ahlen)
ASG Aramäer Ahlen 1983 e.V.
Ahlener Sport Gemeinschaft e.V. (ASG)
Vorwärts Ahlen
FSG Ahlen
Rot Weiss Ahlen
Westfalia Vorhelm
Eintracht Dolberg

Economy
Ahlen's economy was dominated by the coal industry for nearly one century.

Twin towns – sister cities

Ahlen is twinned with:
 Differdange, Luxembourg
 Penzberg, Germany
 Teltow, Germany
 Tempelhof-Schöneberg (Berlin), Germany

Ahlen is a member of the Hanse.

Notable people
Andreas Dombret, Board member of German central bank Deutsche Bundesbank, grew up in Ahlen
Alexander Klaws (born 1983), singer
LaVive's band member Sarah Rensing is from Ahlen
Erkan Teper, professional boxer
Curro Torres, birthplace

References

External links

  

Towns in North Rhine-Westphalia
Members of the Hanseatic League